Professional Murder Music (PMM) is an American industrial metal band from Los Angeles, California. The band was formed by bassist/keyboardist Jeff Schartoff and guitarist/vocalist Roman Marisak in 1998, just prior to the disbandment of their previous band, Human Waste Project.  They are currently signed and own indie label, Wormhole Records.

Their music has been used for such film soundtracks as End of Days, Ginger Snaps, Valentine, and Jet Set Radio, a video game for the Sega Dreamcast. Also, their music has been used on MTV's The Real World. They have also participated in the Tattoo the Earth tour, and shared the stage alongside such other acts such as Fear Factory, Rammstein, Staind, Cold, and Powerman 5000. Since 2001, they have released three full-length albums, and a new single entitled "The Reflection" in 2013.

History 
Jeff Schartoff and Roman Marisak were part of the alternative metal band Human Waste Project, with Schartoff playing bass and Marisak acting as the band's occasional second guitarist. Originally, Professional Murder Music was supposed to act as a side project of the band, and was named after a term Schartoff used to described Human Waste Project's sound. However, when Human Waste Project disbanded in July 1998, Professional Murder Music became both of the bandmembers' full time projects. The band self-released a six-song EP in November 1998, and went on tours opening for Spineshank and Fear Factory, attracting the attention of major labels. On September 9, 1999, Professional Murder Music announced they had signed to Geffen Records.

Discography

Studio albums
 Professional Murder Music (2001)
 Looking Through (2003)
 De Profundis (2005)

Singles
 The Reflection (2013)
 All Comes Down (2021)
 Everending (feat. Charlie Kennedy) (2021)
 Please (2022)

Members
 Roman Marisak – vocals, guitars, programming (1999–present)
 Jeff Schartoff – bass, programming (1999–present)
 Tom Hatziemanouel – guitars (2003–present)

Former members
 Justin Bennett – drums, programming (1999–2004)
 Josh Memolo – drums (2004–2008)
 Chris Olivas – drums (2008–2011)
 Brian Harrah – guitars (1999–2003, 2008)

References

American industrial metal musical groups
American gothic metal musical groups
Nu metal musical groups from California
Musical groups established in 1999
Musical groups from Los Angeles
Geffen Records artists
Underground, Inc. artists